Uglovka is the name of several inhabited localities in Russia.

Urban localities
Uglovka, Novgorod Oblast, a work settlement in Okulovsky District of Novgorod Oblast

Rural localities
Uglovka, Yaroslavl Oblast, a village in Slobodskoy Rural Okrug of Uglichsky District of Yaroslavl Oblast